The Hafei Zhongyi V5 is a microvan by Hafei succeeding the ancient Hafei Zhongyi. The original Hafei Zhongyi microvan was launched in 1999.

Overview

The Zhongyi V5 was launched in 2013, two years after Changan Automobile became the owner of the Hafei brand, and is based on the same platform as the Chana Star 5. Despite the styling similarity, size wise, the Hafei Zhongyi V5 is slightly larger in length, width, and wheelbase than the Chana Star 5. The Zhongyi V5 is powered by a 1.3 liter inline-4 engine producing 100hp, making it also more powerful than the Chana Star 5 that it was based on. The transmission is a 5-speed manual gearbox.

References

External links
Hafei Zhongyi V5 specs

2010s cars
Kei cars
Kei trucks
Rear-wheel-drive vehicles
Microvans
Cars of China
Cars introduced in 2013